Sjur is a short form of the Norwegian masculine given name Sigurd originating from the Old Norse given name Sigurðr which means "victory" and "guarding". Sjur is also used as a surname, but is very rare.

People with the given name 
Sjur Aasmundsen Sexe (1808–1888), Norwegian mineralogist
Sjur Brækhus (1918–2009), Norwegian legal scholar and judge
Sjur Hansen Halkjeldsvik (1787–1868), Norwegian politician
Sjur Helgeland (1858–1924), Norwegian hardingfele fiddler and composer from Voss
Sjur Hopperstad (1930–2015), Norwegian politician for the Centre Party
Sjur Jarle Hauge (born 1971), Norwegian football coach and former player
Sjur Johnsen (1891–1978), Norwegian wrestler
Sjur Lindebrække (1909–1998), Norwegian banker and Conservative Party of Norway politician
Sjur Loen (born 1958), Norwegian curler and world champion
Sjur Røthe (born 1988), Norwegian cross-country skier
Sjur Refsdal (1935–2009), Norwegian astrophysicist, born in Oslo
Sjur Torgersen (1946–2005), Norwegian ambassador and diplomat

Norwegian masculine given names

no:Sjur
nn:Sjur